Malvan (also written as Malwan)  is a town and taluka in Sindhudurg District, the southernmost district of Maharashtra State, India, well known for the historically important Sindhudurg Fort. Malvan taluka consists of villages such as Angane Wadi, Masure, Achra, Khalchi Devli, Jamdul, Juva, Pankhol, Talasheel and Sarjekot. The main occupation here is fishing and agriculture. The staple diet of the local people is fish curry and rice. The town produces Alphonso mangoes and is also known for sweets such as Malvani Khaja made from gram-besan flour and coated jaggery as well as Malvani Ladoos. Other sweets that attract tourists are Konkani Meva, Aambawadi, Fanaspoli, Kajuwadi, and Naralachya Wadya. 

Dashavtar (the ten incarnations of Lord Vishnu), a drama-play based on mythological stories, is an important cultural element of the area. Several apocryphal and some more credible stories related to the name Malvan exist. Salt producers use term 'Mahalavan' to describe a region rich in salt, a compound word from "maha" meaning great, and "lavan" meaning plantation (or salt). Another possibility is a phonetic derivative of the compound of "Mad" and "Ban", Malvani for coconut trees and garden, respectively, relating to the many coconut trees in the region. Malvani, a dialect of Konkani is the local language.

Geography and climate 
Malvan is a compact town situated on the coast of Western India. The area's beaches, Sindhudurg Fort, Tarkarli Beach, Mobar Point, Chivla Beach, Tondavali Beach, are all attract tourists. Malvan  is bound by three small creeks: Karli, Kolamb and Kalavali.

The climate of Malvan can be generally classified as warm and moderately humid. Average temperatures range between 16 and 33 °C while relative humidity ranges from 69 to 98%. The annual average rainfall of Malvan is 2275 mm.

Transport links 

The nearest railway station is at Kudal and Kankawali and the nearest airport is at Sindhudurg. Overnight trains depart daily from Mumbai for Kudal.

There are M.S.R.T.C bus services to Malvan, Kadamba Transport Corporation bus services from Goa. There are buses from Kasal.

Also, there are plenty of buses heading towards Goa which go via Kasal. Malvan can be reached from Kolhapur by any MSRTC or KSRTC bus. Kudal is the centre point for the buses heading towards Sindhudurg, Goa. Buses coming from Pune as well as Sangli, Solapur and Barshi Belgave, Tuljapur have to go via Kolhapur to enter Konkan.

People / Demography 
Malvan is a Municipal Council city in district of Sindhudurg, Maharashtra. The Malvan city is divided into 17 wards for which elections are held every 5 years.  India census, the Malvan Municipal Council has population of 18,648 of which 9,663 are males while 8,985 are females as per report released by Census India 2011.

Population of Children with age of 0-6 is 1364 which is 7.31% of total population of Malvan (M Cl). In Malvan Municipal Council, Female Sex Ratio is of 930 against state average of 929. Moreover, Child Sex Ratio in Malvan is around 876 compared to Maharashtra state average of 894. Literacy rate of Malvan city is 93.00%, higher than state average of 82.34%. In Malvan, male literacy is around 94.76% while female literacy rate is 91.11%.

Malvan Municipal Council has total administration over 4,620 houses to which it supplies basic amenities like water and sewerage. It is also authorized to build roads within Municipal Council limits and impose taxes on properties coming under its jurisdiction.

This area of the Konkan is predominantly Hindu and the majority of these Hindus are Kshatriya Marathas, Bhandaris, Gabits and Kudaldeshkar Gaud Brahmins, Rajapur Saraswat Brahmins. Anganewadi Jatra and 'Bramhan Dev Jatra' are the major fairs in the region. A number of Malvani emigres return to their native place every year during the months of August–September to attend Ganeshotsav, Ram Navmi, and various other local festivals.

Much of population, specially Bhandaris, Gabits, Konkani people are found on the Konkan coast. Especially in Karwar, Ankola, Kumta, Honavar (Karnataka) & Goa, these people have migrated from Malvan way back in the 17th century. They have their ancestral Kuldevatas at Malvan (Dev Rameshwar) etc.

Culture 
 Malvani dialect: Malvan has its unique culture signified by its peculiar dialect and food. Malvan lends its name to 'Malvani' dialect (A Konkani dialect or sometimes referred as a mix of Marathi and Konkani). This dialect is very popular amongst the local population only in the Sindhudurg district and also parts of Northern Goa.
 Cuisine - The cuisine of this region is popularly known as Malvani cuisine. Coconut, rice and fish assume prime significance in the Malvani cuisine.
 Dashavataar (In Devnagari: दशावतार)- It is an art form popular in most of the Konkan region in Maharashtra and more so in and around Malvan. It is a play that depicts the 10 incarnations of Lord Vishnu (as in Hindu mythology).This continues till wee hours of morning. Dashavataar, mainly conducted at the time of "Saptah" which is the mahapuja of Gram Devta. During this all villagers also sale their homemade products like Khaja, Kadak Ladu (popularly known as "Khatkhate Ladu"), Lonache - लोणचें (Pickles), and others. This utsav is the main Parvany (Event) for the villagers. At this very important event, all Chakarmani (A term used for a large number of salaried class people from Konkan who migrated to cities like Mumbai, Pune for livelihood) visit their homes and enjoy the regional sweets (Khaja).
 Barrister Nath Pai Sevangan: Barrister Nath Pai Sevangan is named after the famous freedom fighter and legislator from Maharashtra - Barrister Nath Pai. It is in Dhuriwada, Malwan near the seashore. It undertakes humanitarian work and has huge enclosed community center in which many events take place.
 Pimpal (The Peepal Tree): Pimpal is a peepal tree (Sacred fig) in the heart of the town. So, the city has been named after it. On one side of this tree is a road leading to the municipal corporation, on the other side there is Topiwala High School and a Government health clinic.The Pimpal tree is considered sacred and holy and has been in Malvan for as many as 60 years. It is a place for tea time discussions for the local people.
 Malvan Schramik Maachimar Sangh: The traditional fish-worker union in Malvan, registered in 1987, has local small-scale fishermen as its members.
 Marathi Sahitya Sammelan, the conference on Marathi Literature was held in 1958 in Malvan. It was presided by the then President of the conference Atmaram Ravaji Deshpande alias Kavi Anil in 1958.
Rock Garden, adjoining the beach is a famous tourist spot in Malvan

Wildlife Sanctuary 
The Malvan Marine Wildlife Sanctuary was declared on 13 April 1987, with a core zone of 3.182 km2 and buffer zone of 25.94 km2 (total area being 29.122 km2). The core zone includes the Sindhudurg Fort, Padamged island and other submerged rocky structures. The northeastern border of the buffer zone is 50 m from the sea near Malvan port, while on the east it is a semi-circular sandy beach 500 m parallel to the shore of Malvan, in the south it is near Mandel rock, and in the west touches the Malvan rock.

In India there are a very few places where scuba diving can be done and Malvan is one of them. Due to its relatively clear sea waters, Malvan serves as a perfect spot for scuba diving (done mostly with surface oxygen supply) and snorkeling. 

Near the outer walls of Sindhudurg fort live coral and colorful marine life under the sea are visible. The patch of coral reef at Tarkarli in Malwan is a smaller reef and in turn part of the wider patchy Ratnagiri coral reef, all of which are the inter-tidal living corals reef.

Water sports 
There are various water sports options available throughout Malvan near seacoast at affordable rates.
Tsunami Island (near Devbaug Beach) is a small island on the delta of Tarkarli River. This beach island also is the place to enjoy boat ride in the backwaters of Tarkarli River. This island is not formed due to tsunami waves, but due to this imaginary name it is a popular tourist destination for water sports where one can enjoy rides like Jet-Ski, Banana boat ride, Bumper boat, Kayaks, etc. Best time to visit tsunami island for water sports is during high tide when the small island is partially submerged under the water (till knee length).
booking - www.malvanbeach.com

Tourist attractions 
booking - www.malvanbeach.com
Malvan has emerged as one of the major tourist attraction places in Maharashtra in recent years. Its clean beaches, historical monuments, tasty food/sea food options, various affordable water sports are attracting tourists like magnet. 
There are many guest house options available in Malvan for stay. Oct to May is the best time to visit. Tourists are advised to book the stay in advance in case planning to visit in months of Apr to May and Nov to Dec; there is large influx of tourists during these months.
 Sindhudurg - A sea fort surrounded by sea water from all sides. Only way to reach the fort is by boat. This Sindhudurg (meaning Ocean Fort), was built in 1664 by the 17th century Maratha king, Shivaji on "Kurte" island to the glory of the Maratha Empire.
 Sahyadrivasi - A campground surrounded by sahyadri from all the sides.also the best place for bird watching.
 Tarkarli - A beach located 8 km off Malvan town.
Malvan Beach - Main tourist attraction 0.5 km from Malvan

 
 Nath Pai Sevangan Malvan NGO - Near Chivala beach malvan
 Chivala Beach  Dhuriwada Malvan spc. GOA2
 Rock Garden - The Rock garden is situated near the Arase Mahal and on the Rocky Shore of Malvan.
 Jai Ganesh Mandir
 Arse Mahal Beach
 Tondavali Beach (19 km North of Malvan)
 Achara Beach (22 km north of Malvan)- This is the clearest beach 
 Bhogwe Beach: This beach is on the shores of Sindhudurg district. It is very close to Tarkarli Beach. Nearest city is Kudal or Kankavali, which is well connected with Mumbai Goa highway. 
 Rameshwar Temple (23 km north of Malvan). Temple located Kandalgaon,
 Waingani : There is a Shri Dev Ravalnath Mandir a famous temple. It is a very old temple in Waingani & also a "Gramdaivat" of Waingani. There are many annual festivals. Waingani is 10 km from Malvan city and 40 km from Kankavali. There is a Waingani Beach. 
 Devbaug Beach (12 km south of Malvan)

 Vetal Mandir (4 km North of Malvan)
 Almeidas Ashiyana Beach Resort
 Tsunami Island of Tarkarli:  An island formed after a tsunami hit the coast in 2004. Popular for water activities including scuba diving offered by locals of Malvan Konkan Tours.

l

References 

Cities and towns in Sindhudurg district
Konkan
Talukas in Maharashtra
Tourist attractions in Sindhudurg district
Tourist attractions in Konkan